William John Bennett (born July 31, 1943) is an American conservative politician and political commentator who served as secretary of education from 1985 to 1988 under President Ronald Reagan. He also held the post of director of the Office of National Drug Control Policy under George H. W. Bush.

Early life and education
Bennett was born July 31, 1943 to a Catholic family in Brooklyn, the son of Nancy (née Walsh), a medical secretary, and F. Robert Bennett, a banker. His family moved to Washington, D.C., where he attended Gonzaga College High School. He graduated from Williams College in 1965, where he was a member of the Kappa Alpha Society, and received a Ph.D. from the University of Texas at Austin in political philosophy in 1970. He also has a J.D. from Harvard Law School, graduating in 1971.

Career

Educational institutions 
Bennett was an associate dean of the College of Liberal Arts at Boston University from 1971 to 1972, and then became an assistant professor of philosophy and an assistant to John Silber, the president of the college, from 1972 to 1976. In May 1979, Bennett became the director of the National Humanities Center, a private research facility in North Carolina, after the death of its founder Charles Frankel.

Federal offices 
In 1981 President Reagan appointed Bennett to chair the National Endowment for the Humanities (NEH), where he served until Reagan appointed him secretary of education in 1985. Reagan originally nominated Mel Bradford to the position, but due to Bradford's pro-Confederate views Bennett was appointed in his place. This event was later marked as the watershed in the divergence between paleoconservatives, who backed Bradford, and neoconservatives, led by Irving Kristol, who supported Bennett.

While at NEH, Bennett published "To Reclaim a Legacy: A Report on the Humanities in Higher Education", a 63-page report. It was based on an assessment of the teaching and learning of the humanities at the baccalaureate level, conducted by a blue-ribbon study group of 31 nationally prominent authorities on higher education convened by NEH.

In May 1986, Bennett switched from the Democratic to the Republican Party. In September 1988, Bennett resigned as secretary of education, to join the Washington law firm of Dunnels, Duvall, Bennett, and Porter. In March 1989 he returned to the federal government, becoming the first Director of the Office of National Drug Control Policy, appointed by President George H. W. Bush. He was confirmed by the Senate in a 97–2 vote. He left that position in December 1990.

Radio and television 
In April 2004, Bennett began hosting Morning in America, a nationally syndicated radio program produced and distributed by Dallas, Texas-based Salem Communications. The show aired live weekdays from 6:00 to 9:00 a.m. Eastern Time, and was one of the only syndicated conservative talk shows in the morning drive time slot. However, its clearances were limited due to a preference for local shows in this slot, and the show got most of its clearances on Salem-owned outlets. Morning in America was also carried on Sirius Satellite Radio, on Channel 144, also known as the Patriot Channel. Bennett retired from full-time radio on March 31, 2016.

In 2008, Bennett became the host of a CNN weekly talk show, Beyond the Politics. The show did not have a long run, but Bennett remained a CNN contributor until he was fired in 2013 by then-new CNN president, Jeff Zucker.

Bennett has been moderating The Wise Guys, a Sunday night show on Fox News, since January 2018. Carried on Fox Nation as well, participants include Tyrus, Byron York, Ari Fleischer, Victor Davis Hanson, and others.

Author, speaker, and pundit 
Bennett writes for National Review Online, National Review and Commentary, and is a former senior editor of National Review.

Bennett is a member of the National Security Advisory Council of the Center for Security Policy (CSP). He was co-director of Empower America and was a Distinguished Fellow in Cultural Policy Studies at The Heritage Foundation. Long active in United States Republican Party politics, he is now an author and speaker.

Bennett was the Washington Fellow of the Claremont Institute. He was also a commentator for CNN until 2013.

He is an advisor to Project Lead The Way and Beanstalk Innovation. He is on the advisory board of Udacity, Inc., Viridis Learning, Inc. and the board of directors of Vocefy, Inc. and Webtab, Inc.

In 2017, Bennett launched a podcast, The Bill Bennett Show.

According to internal White House records from January 6, 2021, Bennett spoke on the phone with then-President Donald Trump just before Trump went to the "Save America" rally that preceded the attack on the Capitol.

Political views
Bennett tends to take a conservative position on affirmative action, school vouchers, curriculum reform, and religion in education. As education secretary, he asked colleges to better enforce drug laws and supported a classical education. He frequently criticized schools for low standards. In 1987 he called the Chicago Public Schools system "the worst in the nation." He coined the term "the blob" to describe the state education bureaucracy, a term which was later taken up in Britain by Michael Gove.

Bennett is a staunch supporter of the War on Drugs and has been criticized by some for his views on the issue. On Larry King Live, he said that a viewer's suggestion of beheading drug dealers would be "morally plausible." He also "lamented that we still grant them [drug dealers] habeas corpus rights."

Bennett is a member of the Project for the New American Century (PNAC) and was one of the signers of the January 26, 1998 PNAC Letter sent to President Bill Clinton, which urged Clinton to remove Iraqi leader Saddam Hussein from power.

Bennett is a neoconservative.

Bennett was an advocate for the Iraq War.

Controversies

Gambling
In 2003, it became publicly known that Bennett - who had spent years preaching about family values and personal responsibility - was a high-stakes gambler who lost millions of dollars in Las Vegas. Criticism increased in the wake of Bennett's publication, The Book of Virtues, a compilation of moral stories about courage, responsibility, friendship and other examples of virtue. Joshua Green of the Washington Monthly said that Bennett failed to denounce gambling because of his own tendency to gamble. Also, Bennett and Empower America, the organization he co-founded and headed at the time, opposed an extension of casino gambling in the United States.

Bennett said that his habit had not put himself or his family in any financial jeopardy. After Bennett's gambling problem became public, he said he did not believe his habit set a good example, that he had "done too much gambling" over the years, and his "gambling days are over". "We are financially solvent," his wife Elayne told USA Today. "All our bills are paid." She added that his gambling days are over. "He's never going again," she said.

Several months later, Bennett qualified his position, saying "So, in this case, the excessive gambling is over." He explained "Since there will be people doing the micrometer on me, I just want to be clear: I do want to be able to bet the Buffalo Bills in the Super Bowl."

Radio show abortion comment
On September 28, 2005, in a discussion on Bennett's Morning in America radio show, a caller to the show proposed that "lost revenue from the people who have been aborted in the last 30 years" could preserve Social Security if abortion had not been permitted since Roe v. Wade. Bennett responded that aborting by all African-American babies, "If you wanted to reduce crime, you could—if that were the sole purpose—you could abort every black baby in this country and the crime rate would go down. That would be an impossible, ridiculous, and morally reprehensible thing to do, but your crime rate would go down."

Bennett responded to the criticism saying, in part:

A thought experiment about public policy, on national radio, should not have received the condemnations it has. Anyone paying attention to this debate should be offended by those who have selectively quoted me, distorted my meaning, and taken out of context the dialogue I engaged in this week. Such distortions from 'leaders' of organizations and parties is a disgrace not only to the organizations and institutions they serve, but to the First Amendment.

Books 
 
Bennett's best-known written work may be The Book of Virtues: A Treasury of Great Moral Stories (1993), which he edited; he has also authored and edited eleven other books, including The Children's Book of Virtues (which inspired an animated television series) and The Death of Outrage: Bill Clinton and the Assault on American Ideals (1998).

Other books:
First Lessons. A Report on Elementary Education in America (co-authored in September 1986, as Secretary of Department of Education)
James Madison High School: A Curriculum For American Students (December 1987, as Secretary of the Department of Education)
James Madison Elementary School: A Curriculum For American Students (August 1988, as Secretary of the Department of Education)
The De-Valuing of America: The Fight for Our Culture and Our Children (1992)
Moral Compass: Stories for a Life's Journey (1995)
Body Count: Moral Poverty ... and How to Win America's War Against Crime and Drugs (1996)
Our Sacred Honor (1997, compilation of writings by the Founding Fathers)
The Index of Leading Cultural Indicators (1999)
The Educated Child: A Parent's Guide from Preschool through Eighth Grade (1999)
The Broken Hearth: Reversing the Moral Collapse of the American Family (2001)
Why We Fight: Moral Clarity and the War on Terrorism (2003)
America: The Last Best Hope (Volume I): From the Age of Discovery to a World at War (2006)
America: The Last Best Hope (Volume II): From a World at War to the Triumph of Freedom (2007)
The American Patriot's Almanac: Daily Readings on America, with John Cribb (2008)
The True Saint Nicholas (2009)
A Century Turns: New Hopes, New Fears (2010)
The Book of Man: Readings on the Path to Manhood (2011)
The Fight of our Lives, co-authored with Seth Leibsohn (2011)
Is College Worth It? with David Wilezol (2013)
Going to Pot: Why the Rush to Legalize Marijuana Is Harming America, with Robert A. White (2015)
Tried by Fire: The Story of Christianity's First Thousand Years (2016)

Personal life 
In 1967, as a graduate student, Bennett went on a single blind date with Janis Joplin. He later lamented, “That date lasted two hours, and I’ve spent 200 hours talking about it."

Bennett married his wife, Mary Elayne Glover, in 1982. They have two sons, John and Joseph. Elayne is the president and founder of Best Friends Foundation, a national program promoting sexual abstinence among adolescents.

Bennett is the younger brother of Washington attorney Robert S. Bennett.

See also 
Legalized abortion and crime effect
List of U.S. political appointments that crossed party lines
Race and crime in the United States
Roe effect

References

External links
 Morning in America
 Best Friends Foundation
 
Interview with Bennett, In Depth, July 4, 2010
 

|-

|-

|-

1943 births
Living people
20th-century American non-fiction writers
20th-century American politicians
20th-century American male writers
21st-century American non-fiction writers
21st-century American male writers
American political commentators
American political philosophers
American political writers
American talk radio hosts
Chairpersons of the National Endowment for the Humanities
CNN people
Directors of the Office of National Drug Control Policy
George H. W. Bush administration personnel
Gonzaga College High School alumni
Harvard Law School alumni
The Heritage Foundation
National Review people
New York (state) Democrats
New York (state) Republicans
Politicians from Brooklyn
Reagan administration cabinet members
United States Secretaries of Education
University of Texas at Austin alumni
Washington, D.C., Democrats
Washington, D.C., Republicans
Williams College alumni
Writers from Brooklyn
American male non-fiction writers